Darko Čeferin (born 7 November 1968) is a retired Slovenian international football referee, who was active internationally starting in 2000. As of 2013, however, he is no longer included on the FIFA list for Slovenia.

Čeferin served as a referee in 2002, 2006, and 2010 World Cup qualifiers. He also officiated in qualifying matches for Euro 2004, Euro 2008, and Euro 2012.

References

1968 births
Living people
Slovenian football referees